Dragomirești may refer to several places in Romania:

Dragomirești, Maramureș, a town in Maramureș County
Dragomirești, Dâmbovița, a commune in Dâmbovița County
Dragomirești, Neamț, a commune in Neamț County
Dragomirești, Vaslui, a commune in Vaslui County
Dragomirești, a village in Știuca Commune, Timiș County
Dragomirești-Vale, a commune in Ilfov County, and its village of Dragomirești-Deal